Salil Ashok Ankola (born 1 March 1968) is a former international cricketer who played one Test match and 20 One Day Internationals (ODIs) from 1989 to 1997 for India. A right-arm fast-medium bowler, he played first-class cricket for Mumbai, regularly opening the bowling. Ankola's consistency for Mumbai team earned him a spot for representing India during their tour of Pakistan in 1989–90. After the first Test match at Karachi, he was dropped for the subsequent matches in the series owing to injuries. After a brief phase of playing first-class cricket, Ankola was called for the Indian ODI team during 1993, eventually led to being a part of the 1996 Cricket World Cup. His reputation as a poor fielder, resulted in being dropped from the side after subsequent series. At 28, Ankola retired from international cricket to pursue acting. Since then he went on to appear in a number of Indian soap operas and a few Bollywood movies. In 2020, he was selected as the chief selector of the Mumbai Cricket Association.

Cricketing career

Early achievements

Born in 1968 into a south Indian Konkani-speaking family which hails from the town of Ankola in Uttara Kannada district of Karnataka, Salil Ankola made his first-class debut at the age of 20 for Maharashtra in 1988–89. Playing against Gujarat he scored 43 runs and took a six-wicket haul (six wickets in an innings) that included a hat-trick. He followed with another six-wicket haul; six wickets for 51 runs in an innings against Baroda. Overall, he collected 27 wickets at an average of 20.18 including three five wicket hauls during the season. Owing to the consistent performances during the season, Ankola caught the attention of the selectors, as he was selected for the India's tour of Pakistan in 1989–90. In a warm up match against BCCP Patron's XI he took six wickets for 77 runs in the first innings and collecting two more wickets in the second innings, thus taking his tally to eight wickets.

First class cricket
Ankola made his Test debut during the first test of the tour at Karachi, alongside Sachin Tendulkar and Waqar Younis, both would go on to become successful cricketers later in their careers. In a match that was drawn, Ankola took two wickets for 128 runs. Injuries sustained thereafter and prevented him from appearing in the remaining Tests of the series.

Soon after the Test series, that was drawn, Ankola was called for the ODI series. He made his ODI debut in the second of the three-match series; the first ODI was abandoned due to bad lights. Ankola picked up two wickets conceding 26 runs. He arrived at number 10 in the second innings at a stage where India needed 15 runs of one over. Ankola hit a six of the first ball that he faced off Imran Khan but eventually ended on the losing side. In the next match, he bowled just 2.3 overs (15 balls) before the match was called off due to crowd disruption. Despite being selected in the Test squads on domestic series and overseas tours, he never got an opportunity to play for the team. Being dropped from the team without getting a game was known in cricket circles as being "Ankolad". However, Ankola continued to play ODI cricket. In the early 1990s, he along with other bowlers such as Abey Kuruvilla, Paras Mhambrey, Nilesh Kulkarni and Sairaj Bahutule was trained under Frank Tyson. Ankola mainly worked on altering his style rather than pace.

During this period, Ankola married Parineeta; the couple has two children—a daughter and a son.

After a period of three years, Ankola was selected for the Charms Cup against England and Zimbabwe at home. In a match against South Africa during the 1993 Hero Cup, he captured three wickets for 33 runs, which remained his career-best bowling figures in ODIs.

In 1996, Ankola was selected in the Indian team for the World Cup. In the tournament he played just one match against Sri Lanka. In a match that India lost, he conceded 28 runs off five overs without claiming any wicket. Shortly after the World Cup, the selectors with immediate effect dropped Ankola along with Vinod Kambli and all-rounder Manoj Prabhakar—all were a part of the squad earlier—for the Singer cup and Pepsi Sharjah Cup. Ankola was replaced by medium-fast bowler Prashant Vaidya. However, Ankola was subsequently selected for the Indian team that toured South Africa in 1996—97. Despite being a part of the squad, he was never given a chance to represent the playing XI in any of the Test matches. Following the Test series, he was picked up for the Standard Bank International ODI tournament; he played five games in the tournament against South Africa and Zimbabwe. In the finals against South Africa that India lost, Ankola conceded 50 runs in seven overs in what became his last match; the spell included a catch being taken off a no-ball and a dropped chance. The tour remained his last in international cricket as he was never selected for the team again. Following that, Ankola declared his retirement from international cricket the same year.

Post retirement contributions to cricket
In March 2010, BCCI granted Ankola a benefit matchTwenty20 benefit match between Sachin Tendulkar XI and Sourav Ganguly XI at the Andheri Sports Complex, Mumbai. The squad included Ankola himself along with Mahendra Singh Dhoni, captain of the Indian national cricket team then. A writer noted that, "Salil Ankola is indeed fortunate. Not many players get to witness an unexpected visitor in the form of the current India captain turning up for his benefit match".

In 2020, Salil Ankola was selected as the chief selector of the Mumbai Cricket Association.
He wanted to come back to cricket and give back to the game what the game has given him so much and in 2020 he applied for the selection committee post for MUMBAI CRICKET ASSOCIATION and he was appointed the CHAIRMAN OF MUMBAI SENIOR & U25 COMMITTEE on 16 December 2020
When Salil Ankola was appointed the chief selector of MUMBAI TEAM the team has not being doing well and had not won a single trophy in 6 years, he was given the job of rebuilding the team and getting back MUMBAI CRICKET's lost glory. 
Under his Chairmanship MUMBAI won the VIJAY HAZARE TROPHY in 2021/22 season after a long gap .
In 2022/23 season MUMBAI senior team reached the finals of the Ranji trophy and also won the U25 CK NAYUDU TROPHY
Also in 2022/23 season MUMBAI SENIOR TEAM won the SYED MUSTAQ ALI TROPHY CHAMPIONSHIP for the first time since its commencement in 2006/07.
In his Chairmanship the team  rebuilding process started as average age of present Mumbai team is 25 and results speak for itself. 
So it's right to say that Salil Ankola has done a good job as Chairman of Mumbai Selection Committee in his appointment for last 3 seasons.

Acting career
After retiring from cricket, Ankola shifted his focus towards entering films. He made his cinematic debut through the 2000 Hindi film Kurukshetra, where he played the role of a cop accompanying his senior officer played by Sanjay Dutt. He followed that with Pitaah (2002), and his last major release Chura Liyaa Hai Tumne (2003) featured him alongside Esha Deol and Zayed Khan. The following year he acted in Silence Please...The Dressing Room, where he played the character of a cricket captain. The film did not fare well at the box-office, nonetheless Ankola's performance was highly appreciated. He also participated in the first season of Bigg Boss, Indian version of the reality show Big Brother in 2006. Prior to that, he acted in the Indian soap opera titled Karam Apna Apna, where he signed a contract with Balaji Telefilms that "[Ankola] would not act in any television show on any channel apart from those produced by Balaji Films". Since he appeared in Bigg Boss before the contract would expire—one year from June 2006—the Bombay High Court ordered him not to act in any TV shows on other channels that are considered rivals for Sony Television. Ssshhhh...Koi Hai and Kora Kagaz are some of the other soap operas that he has acted.

Ankola went through a bad patch in the period 2008–12. Neither his cricket career nor his acting career had brought in enough money to support his growing family expenses. Financial issues and frustration led to a combination of alcoholism and breakdown of marital relations. The BCCI (India's apex cricket board) arranged a benefit match for him in 2010, to boost his finances, but it was too little. His first marriage of 19 years (1992-2011) ended in divorce in 2011, after which he slowly recovered enough to resume acting on television.

In February 2013, Salil was seen as Savitri's father in the daily show Savitri but was replaced by Shahbaz Khan in August 2013 after a revamp of the show. Rumors are that he will be seen in an episode of the popular Zee TV show, Fear Files.
He and his wife were a part of the reality show POWER COUPLE in 2015 and Salil Ankola went on to act in the super hit show KARAMPHALDATA SHANI in 2016 which had a good run for 2 years and also the show was dubbed in almost 12 different languages across the world .
This was his last appearance in television shows as post this show he acted in South films and in 2020 returned to cricket as CHAIRMAN OF MUMBAI SENIOR U25 SELECTION COMMITTEE.

Filmography
 2000: Kurukshetra
 2002: Pitaah
 2003: Chura Liyaa Hai Tumne
 2004: Silence Please...The Dressing Room
 2012: Riwayat
 2018: Tera Intezaar
 2019: Ekta
 2021: The Power
2022: Paambattam (Tamil)

Television

As an actor
 1997 Saturday Suspense - The Tenant - Episode 31
 1998–1999  Chahat Aur Nafrat as Vishal
 1998–2000: Lekin... Woh Sach Tha 
 1998 - 1999  Kora Kagaz as Ravi
 1999:  Rishtey 
 2000 - 2001:  Noorjahan as Yusuf Chak
 2002 - 2005 Kehta Hai Dil as Ranveer Rathore / Sandeep Jain / Shakti Singh 
 2003 - 2004 Ssshhhh...Koi Hai as Vikraal
 2003 - 2004 Vikraal Aur Gabraal as Vikraal
 2005 Zindagi Teri Meri Kahani
 2005 - 2006 CID: Special Bureau as Senior Inspector Akshay
 2006 Ak...tion Unlimited Josh
 2006 - 2009 Karam Apnaa Apnaa as Mahen Kapoor
 2009 - 2010 Pyaar Ka Bandhan as Vikram
 2013 Savitri - EK Prem Kahani as Maharaj
 2013 Savdhaan India as Kunal Singh 
 2016 - 2018 Karmaphal Daata Shani as Surya Dev 
February 10, 2020 – December 26, 2020 Devi Adi Parashakti as Surya Dev (Replacement by Sanjay Sharma)

Reality television

Background and personal life
Born in 1968 into a south Indian Konkani-speaking family which hails from the town of Ankola in Uttara Kannada district of Karnataka. Ankola was born into a Karnataka konkani family in 1968.

In 2008, it was reported that Ankola has been suffering from depression and was enrolled in a rehabilitation centre in Pune. The reason behind the illness was believed to be his severe addiction to alcohol. As a result of this his wife decided to settle with her parent in Pune with their children, leaving Ankola isolated.

After his recovery in January 2010, Ankola sent a legal notice to his wife demanding mutual consent for separation. His wife responded that, "there was [no] problem or a marital breakdown ... wanted to work on a reconciliation, not divorce." Ankola, when asked about reconciliation, said he was not willing to do so. The couple finally got divorced in 2011. On 22 December 2013, Parineeta's body was found hanging from the ceiling fan of her room at her residence in Geeta Society, Salisbury Park, in Pune.

See also
One Test Wonder

References

1968 births
Cricketers at the 1996 Cricket World Cup
India One Day International cricketers
India Test cricketers
Indian cricketers
West Zone cricketers
Mumbai cricketers
Maharashtra cricketers
Living people
People from Solapur
Cricketers who have acted in films
Bigg Boss (Hindi TV series) contestants